Rodeway Inn is a chain of economy-priced hotels in the United States and Canada. Founded by Michael Robinson in 1962, the franchise is now led by Choice Hotels corporation.

As of June 30, 2020, there are 578 Rodeway Inn locations in North America, with approximately 33,107 rooms across the continent. Each hotel is a franchise, managed by a private investor.

History
The chain was established in Phoenix, Arizona, in 1962. Michael Robinson and his son-in-law Joe Simmons opened the chain under the name Rodeway Inns of America. In 1971, the Vantage Company of Dallas, Texas, acquired the hotel chain. Prudential Life Insurance partnered with Rodeway Inns to finance the company-owned inns with the goal of becoming a franchise. In 1976, the company began focusing exclusively on franchising. In 1985, Ladbrokes purchased the brand, and two years later sold the chain to Ramada.

In 1990, the brand became a part of the Choice Hotels corporate group, along with Friendship Inn and Econo Lodge. The Friendship Inn chain was absorbed by the Rodeway Inn and Econo Lodge brands at this time.

In 2005, Rodeway Inn, led by Division President Kevin Bradt, reorganized its franchise structure to attract franchisees to the hotel chain. In 2007, Rodeway Inn was named the fastest growing chain in the hotel industry by Lodging Magazine. As of 2018, Rodeway Inn is still a part of Choice Hotels International.

Franchise structure
It costs approximately $500,000 in liquid revenue to invest in a Rodeway Inn franchise. As of 2018, the franchise offers a revenue percentage fee structure, similar to its sister brand, Econolodge.

See also
 List of hotels
 Choice Hotels

References

External links

Hotels established in 1962
Hotel chains in the United States
Choice Hotels brands
History of Phoenix, Arizona
History of Dallas
Motels in Canada
Motels in the United States
1962 establishments in Arizona
American companies established in 1962